

Earth Lord

Earth Sentry
Earth Sentry  (John Foster) was created by Tom DeFalco and Ron Frenz, and first appeared in A-Next #2 (1999) in the MC2 universe.

When John and his father Bill were investigating a UFO crash site, they discovered a Kree space probe. Upon nearing the ship, the automated defenses activated, and a robotic sentry was released. Bill activated a distress signal which was picked up by Mainframe and the rest of A-Next.

When the heroes arrived, a Sentry robot attacked them. Thunderstrike's sonic blasts and J2's superstrength were not slowing the attacker. Stinger was able to blind the robot's optic sensors with sting darts, providing an opening for John to enter the ship and try to turn off the robotic sentry. When John made contact with the ship's console, a strange energy surge ripped through the ship's computers and struck him. The energy wave reconfigured John's DNA, making him genetically similar to a Kree warrior. Finding himself clad in a green-and-white costume, similar to the original costume of Mar-Vell, John discovered that he had acquired great powers.

John confronted and defeated the Sentry, and stated that he would become an "Earth Sentry" to protect his planet from invaders. He politely declined membership with A-Next, but when the team was later captured by the Revengers, Earth Sentry returned and used his powers to help A-Next defeat the invaders. He then accepted membership with A-Next.

Earth Sentry possesses superhuman strength and durability, due to his altered human/Kree DNA. His costume has wrist-mounted blasters that can fire photonic energy blasts. Rocket boosters on his belt allow him to fly.

Ebon Samurai

Echo

Ectokid

Ethan Edwards

Eel

Leopold Stryke

Edward Lavell

Egghead

Elihas Starr

Robot

Ego the Living Planet

Eitri

El Aguila

El Guapo
A member of X-Statix

Electric Eve
A member of the Morlocks

Electro
Electro is the name of multiple fictional characters from Marvel Comics.

Robot
The first comics character using the Electro alias name was the robot super hero Electro, who possessed superhuman strength and could run at 100 miles per hour. He starred in a backup feature star in Marvel Mystery Comics, the flagship title of Marvel's Golden Age predecessor, Timely Comics. Created by writer-artist Steve Dahlman, Electro appeared in Marvel Mystery #4—19 (February 1940—May 1941). His origin story described his invention by Professor Philo Zog, one of a group of twelve known as the Secret Operatives.

In The Twelve by J. Michael Straczynski and Chris Weston (published in 2008 and 2012), Electro is part of a cadre of heroes trapped in a secret bunker during the Battle of Berlin, seemingly for examination by Nazi scientists. After the fall of the Third Reich, the eleven heroes are left in suspended animation, with no one knowing of their final fate, and Electro is cut off from the telepathic mindwaves of Philo Zog.

When, sixty years later, the Twelve are recovered and brought back to New York, in a safehouse for rehabilitation to modern times, the still inactive Electro is stored in a garage in the same safehouse, its property contended by Elizabeth Zogolowski, niece of Philo Zog, and the U.S. Government, willing to disassemble Electro for the secrets of his telepathic interface. Miss Zogolowski reveals how the telepathic bond between Philo and his creation was so strong that Philo died shortly after the war from an acute withdrawal syndrome.

Miss Zogolowski is able to obtain temporary custody over Electro, but lacks the wealth necessary to reclaim its possession: the Blue Blade steps in, offering her all the needed money in exchange for using Electro in his cabaret-like show.

Electro influences the time-traveling adventures in the Avengers/Invaders crossover. As one of the heroes lost in an alternate-universe World War II, Iron Man uses his armor's holograms to disguise himself as Electro. This fails to work for the Red Skull has already slain Electro, along with most of the 'Mystery Men'.

Ivan Kronov
Marvel's next Electro was a Communist supervillain created during the unsuccessful attempt by Marvel's 1950s predecessor, Atlas Comics, to revive superheroes in that decade. This Electro, a Soviet citizen named Ivan Kronov, appeared on the cover and in the six-page story "His Touch is Death" in Captain America #78 (September 1954), penciled and inked by John Romita Sr. and almost certainly if not confirmably written by Stan Lee. Many years later, this Electro reappeared in What If? #9 (June 1978), "What If the Avengers had been Formed During the 1950s?" and, in flashback, in Captain America Annual #13 (1994).

Max Dillon

Francine Frye

Electron

Electron is a Shi'ar who is a member of the Shi'ar Imperial Guard. The character, created by writer Chris Claremont and artist Dave Cockrum, first appeared in Uncanny X-Men #107 (October 1977). Electron can manipulate magnetism and project bolts of electrical energy. Like many original members of the Imperial Guard, Electron is the analog of a character from DC Comics' Legion of Super-Heroes: in his case Cosmic Boy.

Part of the division of the Imperial Guard known as the Superguardians, Electron is amongst the first of the Imperial Guard encountered by the team of superhuman mutant adventurers known as the X-Men who sought to rescue the Princess-Majestrix Lilandra Neramani from her insane brother, then-Majestor D'Ken. After the battle, Lilandra takes over as Majestrix, and the Guard swears allegiance to her. Some time later, the Guardsmen again come into conflict with the X-Men regarding Dark Phoenix, this time at the behest of Empress Lilandra.

Lilandra's sister Deathbird becomes Shi'ar Empress in a coup. Electron is with the Guard when they come into conflict with a rogue Space Knight named Pulsar and an alien named Tyreseus. After a large battle which also involves Rom and other Space Knights — which leads to the deaths of four new Guardsman — Pulsar and Tyreseus are defeated.

Empress Deathbird commands the entire Imperial Guard, including Electron, to fight the combined forces of the Starjammers and Excalibur on Earth so that she can claim the power of the Phoenix Force for herself. The Guard are forced to retreat when Deathbird is put in danger. (Some time later War Skrulls impersonating Charles Xavier and the Starjammers depose Deathbird and restore Lilandra Neramani to the throne. Deathbird cedes the empire back to Lilandra as she has grown bored of the bureaucracy.)

Electron has many further adventures with the Imperial Guard, in storylines involving Thanos and the Beyonder/Kosmos and such storylines as "Emperor Vulcan," X-Men: Kingbreaker, "Secret Invasion," "War of Kings," "X-Men: Kingbreaker," "Realm of Kings," the "Infinity" crossover, the "Trial of Jean Grey," and the return of Thanos.

Elektra

Elixir

Elias Spector 
Elias Spector is a fictional character appearing in American comic books published by Marvel Comics. He is the father of Marc Spector/Moon Knight. The character first appeared in Marvel Spotlight #28 (January, 1976), created by Alan Zelenetz and Bo Hampton.

Fictional character biography 
When he was a kid, Elias Spector fled with his mother and 'Yitz Perlman' from Nazi prosecution after Adolf Hitler invaded Czechoslovakia. Perlman was a Nazi deserter who had adopted the identity of a long-lost rabbi friend of Elias' father in exchange for helping them flee to America. He had also killed Elias' father since he was the only person that knew of his true identity. Elias, his mother, and Perlman settled in Chicago, Illinois, and Elias was taught by Perlman to become a rabbi.

Elias later had a two sons, Marc and Randall. He would walk his kids to school everyday, but him being a Rabbi caused his youngest to be bullied, but Marc was there to defend his younger sibling. He was disappointed with his boys violent nature and their obsession with war, he believed that should concentrate on their education but his wife dismissed this as boy being boys.

As part of a supernatural method to extend his lifespan, Perlman became a serial killer of Jews. After Marc stumbled upon his secret by chance, Yitz left the city and was never seen again. Due to the traumatic experience, Marc developed a dissociative identity disorder, and never told anyone about Perlman's true nature. When Marc's multiple personalities started manifesting, Elias interned him at the Putnam Psychiatric Hospital. After his father's death, Marc was allowed to leave the hospital temporarily to attend the funeral and a late luncheon, but, after hearing Khonshu's voice, he ran way. After his death Marc resented his father, believing that Elias was embarrassed by him.

In other media 
Elias Spector appears in the Marvel Cinematic Universe television series Moon Knight episode "Asylum", portrayed by Rey Lucas. In Marc's memories, Elias was the only one who had been taking care of him since childhood from his abusive wife Wendy, who blamed him for the death of their younger son Randall, but did not have enough courage to support him. After the death of his wife, Elias saw Marc through the window knowing that she left his life by not going to her funeral.

El Muerto
TBA

Matthew Ellis
Matthew Ellis is the President of the United States in the Marvel Cinematic Universe. Created by Shane Black and Drew Pearce, he is portrayed by William Sadler. His name is an easter egg to writer Warren Ellis. The character first appears in Iron Man 3 as "President Ellis", the originator of the "Iron Patriot" concept as an "American hero" symbol in response to the battle of New York. Ellis is kidnapped by Eric Savin and Aldrich Killian to be executed on television, but is rescued by Tony Stark and James Rhodes. His first name is revealed in Captain America: The Winter Soldier on an exhibit involving Bucky Barnes and he is later targeted by Alexander Pierce's Helicarriers, but is saved by Steve Rogers. Sadler reprises his role in the Agents of S.H.I.E.L.D. season three episode "Laws of Nature" to establish the Advanced Threat Containment Unit (ATCU) as a replacement of S.H.I.E.L.D., and the WHIH Newsfront viral marketing campaign which promoted Ant-Man and Captain America: Civil War. The character also appears in the video games Iron Man 3: The Official Game and Captain America: The Winter Soldier - The Official Game.

Mitchell Ellison
Mitchell Ellison was a fictional character who originated in the Netflix adaptation of Daredevil, portrayed by Geoffrey Cantor. The character, created by Marco Ramirez, first appeared in the episode "Rabbit in a Snowstorm".

Ellison is the editor-in-chief of the New York Bulletin. Known for his dry, yet knowledgeable demeanor, Ellison believes in his employees' abilities to research and report a good story. He is long time friends with Ben Urich, whom he considers his most trusted reporter. Their friendship hits a snag with the appearance of the Devil of Hell's Kitchen and the rise in organized crime. As Ben insists on reporting on Wilson Fisk, Ellison wants him to work on meaningless fluff pieces to boost the paper's ailing circulation numbers. Ellison still looks out for Urich, as he later offers Ben a promotion to a higher position that would guarantee Ben could pay for his wife Doris' medical bill, but Ben politely turns him down.

Ellison and Ben finally have a falling out when Ben tries to print a story about Fisk killing his own father, but Ellison shoots him down citing a lack of proof. Ben begins to accuse him of being on Fisk's payroll, and such accusations get him fired as a result. After Fisk kills Ben, Ellison attends his funeral and receives a cold stare from Karen Page. Ultimately, Ellison's secretary Caldwell turns out to be Fisk's informant as she is arrested by the FBI as part of a sweep orchestrated on Hoffman's testimony. Realizing he had failed Ben, Ellison could only put his head down in shame.

In season two, Ellison aids Karen in looking into Frank Castle's background. Seeing potential in her research skills, he offers her a reporter position at the Bulletin and gives her Ben's old office. However, Ellison feels that Karen is getting too involved in the story regarding Frank and suggests that she get police protection. When Karen accuses him that he would not have done that to Ben, he states that he will not make that mistake again. After Frank rescues Karen from the Blacksmith, she visits Ellison who is relieved to see that she is okay. Ellison even suggests writing Frank in a positive light after everything she has learned about him.

Ellison reappears in The Punisher. Karen comes to him asking about any information regarding someone named Micro. Ellison revealed that he had received a story from Micro about possible corrupted government officials, but he was convinced not to publish it by Carson Wolf as it would hinder their investigation. However, he kept the story and information and gives it to Karen for her research. He later tries to reason with Karen after she receives a letter from bomber, Lewis Wilson. When Frank's face is seen on camera and shown on the news, Ellison deduces that Karen was aware of him being alive.

In season three of Daredevil, Ellison realizes that Karen is still concerned about the collapse of Midland Circle and has her take on another story that ironically qualms her concerns. He later tries to set her up with his nephew, Jason, only for the two of them to learn about Fisk's sudden "freedom". Ellison reveals that his wife Lily is still somewhat traumatized by the events of the first season and that she would call him to see if he was okay despite Fisk's incarceration. When Karen begins connecting Fisk to the Red Lion National Bank, Ellison congratulates her, but gives the story to someone else due to her past association.

Ellison is later present when Matt and Karen bring in Jasper Evans, a convict paid by Fisk to shank him, and have him go on record about his association with Fisk. However, they are attacked by Benjamin "Dex" Poindexter, who has been sent by Fisk to the Bulletin to kill Evans and discredit Matt. Dex stabs Ellison in the stomach with a pencil, but he survives. While recovering in the hospital, Karen hints that she knows that the Daredevil that attacked them was not the real one, causing Ellison to deduce that Karen knows Daredevil's identity. Angered over the loss of his coworkers, he forces Karen to resign when she refuses to compromise Matt's secret identity.

Later, after Karen survives another attempt on her life from Dex, she is reunited with Ellison. While he is happy to see she is safe, still has not forgiven her for protecting the real Daredevil. She is able to convince Ellison to get in contact with several outlets so that she can hold an impromptu press conference while Matt and Foggy get FBI agent Ray Nadeem to testify against Fisk in front of a grand jury. The plan fails, though, as Fisk has anticipated their move and coerced all of the jurors into not indicting him. Before being executed by Dex on Vanessa's orders, Nadeem films a dying declaration, which is handed down from his widow to Foggy, Karen, and finally Ellison, who hurriedly publishes the video on the Bulletin website, and which ensures that Fisk is sent back to prison. He is last seen attending Father Lantom's funeral, having now fully made amends with Karen.

Mitchell Ellison in comics
Mitchell Ellison and the New York Bulletin are mentioned in Kingpin (vol. 2) #4, cementing their existence in the mainstream Marvel Universe. Journalist Sarah Dewey is given a folder by Wilson Fisk containing several notices and letters with Ellison being listed as the new editor-in-chief of the Bulletin after it was dropped from under the control of Gavin Boyce.

Elsie-Dee

Elysius

Empath

Emplate
He first appeared in Generation X #1, and was created by Scott Lobdell and Chris Bachalo. Emplate would serve as one of the major antagonists to the Generation X comic book series during its run.

Publishing history 
The character first appeared in Generation X #1 (November 1994).

Fictional character biography 
Emplate was born Marius St. Croix, the brother of Generation X's M (Monet) and the M-Twins (Nicole & Claudette). When his mutant powers first manifested, his sisters were disgusted, especially Monet. In retaliation, Marius somehow turned Monet into the mute and diamond-skinned Penance.

Enchantress

Amora

Sylvie Lushton

En Dwi Gast

Energizer

Enforcer

Charles L. Delazny, Jr.

Mike Nero

Ent

Entropy
Entropy is a cosmic entity associated with the concept of Entropy.

Eon
Eon is a cosmic entity associated with Time.

Epoch
Epoch is the "daughter" of Eon and "granddaughter" of Eternity.

Equinox

Ereshkigal

Goddess

Deviant

Eric the Red

Erg

Ernst
Ernst, a fictional mutant created by Grant Morrison and Frank Quitely, first appeared in New X-Men #135 (April 2003).

Ernst, whose physical appearance suggests that she may be a teenage girl suffering from progeria or dyskeratosis congenita, is a student at the Xavier Institute. She briefly joined the so-called Brotherhood assembled by the mutant Xorn when he went on a drug-induced, destructive rampage as Magneto in New York City. Ernst did not show any signs of aggression herself. She is one of the few mutants who have retained their powers after the events of "M-Day". She continues living at the Xavier Institute.

In the alternate dystopian future of Here Comes Tomorrow, Ernst is revealed to actually be a rehabilitated Cassandra Nova, or at least a fragment of her, but this has yet to be revealed in the present era.

During the Quest for Magik arc, she was transported to Limbo alongside the other students and was captured by Belasco. She returned to the school with the rest of her classmates when Magik/Darkchilde sent them all back to the human world.

Later, Ernst appears with the inhabitants of Utopia, the new base of X-Men.

As part of the Jean Grey school's remedial class, she goes on weekly crime-fighting patrols with Special Counselor Spider-Man.

Abraham Erskine

Abraham Erskine is a scientist during World War II in the Marvel Universe. The character, created by Joe Simon and Jack Kirby, first appeared in Captain America Comics #1 (March 1941) as Professor Reinstein. The name was revised after Marvel resumed using Captain America. A 1965 retelling of Captain America's origin identified the character as Dr. Erskine. Roy Thomas added that "Josef Reinstein" was an alias in a 1975 story set during World War II. The full name Abraham Erskine would not be applied to the character until years later.

Within the context of the stories, Abraham Erskine is a German biochemist and physicist who had spent much of his early life studying the human species. During this time he develops a diet and exercise program along with a serum and "vita-rays" which would transform an ordinary person into a "super soldier". Horrified when he witnesses Adolf Hitler and Baron Zemo test a "death ray" on a human subject, he contacts the United States to defect from Nazi Germany. After the United States Army gets him out of Germany and fakes his death, he takes the alias "Josef Reinstein".

He recreates the Super Soldier Serum for Project: Rebirth for the U.S. Army. He oversees and administers the treatment to Steve Rogers before several U.S. Army officers and government officials. Moments after Rogers' transformation, Erskine is assassinated by Heinz Kruger.

He is the grandfather of Michael Van Patrick.

Abraham Erskine in other media

Television
 The character of Abraham Erskine was adapted for appearances in two animated television series, The Marvel Super Heroes and The Avengers: Earth's Mightiest Heroes.
 Stanley Tucci reprised his role as Abraham Erskine in the Disney+ animated series, What If...?

Film
 Dr. Maria Vaselli, played by Carla Cassoli, is an Italian scientist that had a similar role as Dr. Erskine in the 1990 Captain America film.
 Stanley Tucci portrays the character in the Marvel Cinematic Universe film Captain America: The First Avenger (2011). While he is still a German defector in the film, before defecting, he was forced to test the serum in Germany on Johann Schmidt who would become the Red Skull. He was killed by HYDRA agent Kruger after administering the Super-Soldier Serum on Steve.

Eson the Searcher

Eternity

E.V.A.

Christine Everhart
Christine Everhart is a fictional character appearing in American comic books published by Marvel Comics.

Christine Everhart works for The Daily Bugle as an investigative reporter. As part of her job, she covers Tony Stark's appearance before the U.S. Senate.

Christine Everhart in other media
The character of Christine Everhart appears in live-action media set in the Marvel Cinematic Universe (MCU), portrayed Leslie Bibb.
 Introduced in the film Iron Man (2008), the character works for Vanity Fair because Sony Pictures owned the film rights to the Daily Bugle at the time. She conducts two interviews with Tony Stark about Stark Industries' weapons, with the first encounter ending in them having a one-night stand.
 Everhart makes a brief appearance in Iron Man 2 (2010), in which she writes an article on Justin Hammer.
 In July 2015, as part of a viral marketing campaign for Ant-Man (2015), Everhart appears on the faux news program WHIH Newsfront. In the program, she discusses the events following Avengers: Age of Ultron, Scott Lang's incarceration during Ant-Man, and the events leading up to Captain America: Civil War.
 Alternate timeline versions of Everhart make a cameo appearance in the Disney+ animated series What If...?, with Bibb reprising the role. In the episode "What If... Doctor Strange Lost His Heart Instead of His Hands?", she reports on the death of Christine Palmer in one of several altered timelines created by Stephen Strange. In the episode "What If... Killmonger Rescued Tony Stark?", she takes part in a press conference where Erik "Killmonger" Stevens exposes Obadiah Stane's role in a terrorist attack meant to kill Stark.

Everyman

Ex Nihilo

Executioner

Exodus

Ezekiel

References

Marvel Comics characters: E, List of